Marco Antonio Mendoza Sevilla (born 18 September 1980) is a Mexican football midfielder, who plays for Correcaminos UAT in Liga de Ascenso.

Mendoza began his career with the Club León youth team, Cachorros. It was with León that Mendoza made his professional debut, as the team was playing in the Primera Division de Mexico. After León was relegated, he moved to Lagartos de Tabasco, but their stay in the Primera Division A was short-lived.

After going back to León and playing there for a while, Mendoza was later transferred to Dorados de Sinaloa, where he made a return to the top flight.

After the team dropped out of the Primera Division, he played in the Monarcas Morelia system, but never broke into the first team. He instead had better luck with Petroleros de Salamanca.

When Salamanca in 2009 became La Piedad, Mendoza was one of the handful of players that left with the team.

External links
 
 

1980 births
Living people
Mexican footballers
Association football midfielders
Club León footballers
Lagartos de Tabasco footballers
Dorados de Sinaloa footballers
Salamanca F.C. footballers
La Piedad footballers
Correcaminos UAT footballers
Liga MX players
Ascenso MX players
Footballers from Mexico City